Tiras Odisho is an ethnic Assyrian former Martial Arts practitioner and expert who has served as the Director General of the National Olympic Committee of Iraq. He currently resides in Sweden.

References

Year of birth missing (living people)
Living people
Iraqi Assyrian people